Niaogho  is a department or commune of Boulgou Province in eastern Burkina Faso. Its capital lies at the town of Niaogho. According to the 1996 census the department has a total population of 25,702.

Towns and villages
 Niaogho (13 545 inhabitants) (capital)
 Bassindingo (1 279 inhabitants) 
 Gozi (1 025 inhabitants) 
 Ibogo (1 752 inhabitants) 
 Niaogho-Peulh (305 inhabitants) 
 Niarba (1 649 inhabitants) 
 Sondogo (428 inhabitants) 
 Tengsoba (5 719 inhabitants)

References

Departments of Burkina Faso
Boulgou Province